In the run up to the 2024 Ukrainian presidential election, various organisations carried out opinion polling to gauge voting intention in Ukraine. The results of such polls are displayed in this article. The date range for these polls are from the 2019 Ukrainian presidential election to the present day.

First round
During the 2019 Ukrainian presidential election candidate (and latter winner of the election) Volodymyr Zelenskyy stated that he was running for only one term. In May 2021, Zelenskyy stated that it was too early to say whether he will run for a second term, but this decision would depend on the attitude to him in society and would be influenced by his family.

Since November 2021

April 2021 – October 2021

September 2020 – March 2021

February 2020 – July 2020

Second round

Zelenskyy vs. Poroshenko

Zelenskyy vs. Tymoshenko

Zelenskyy vs. Boyko

Zelenskyy vs. Razumkov

Poroshenko vs. Tymoshenko

Poroshenko vs. Boyko

Poroshenko vs. Razumkov

See also
Opinion polling for the next Ukrainian parliamentary election
Opinion polling for the 2019 Ukrainian presidential election

Notes

References

Presidential elections in Ukraine
next
Ukrainian presidential election